Laura Caldwell (October 24, 1967 – March 1, 2020) was a civil trial lawyer and also a law professor at Loyola University Chicago School of Law, founding director of Life After Innocence, published author of 14 novels and two non-fiction books. The latest book she co-edited is "Anatomy of Innocence: Testimonies of the Wrongfully Convicted" (Liveright, 2017), which tells the true stories of over a dozen innocent men and women who were convicted of serious crimes and cast into the maw of a vast and deeply flawed American criminal justice system before eventually, miraculously being exonerated.

With novels published in over 25 countries and translated into more than 13 languages, Caldwell had left the law behind, or so she thought. Research on her sixth novel led her to the criminal case of a young man sitting in a Cook County holding cell for nearly six years without a trial. Compelled by his story, Caldwell joined a renowned criminal defense attorney to defend him, ultimately proving his innocence and inspiring her first nonfiction book, Long Way Home: A Young Man Lost in the System and the Two Women Who Found Him (Free Press, Simon & Schuster).

By working with him and witnessing his intense struggle to assimilate into a now foreign and unfriendly world, Caldwell became keenly aware that while many programs are available for ex-offenders after their release, the innocent in most states receive no assistance. As a champion for the innocent, Caldwell was moved to create Life After Innocence, an innovative and first-of-its-kind program that helped exonerees—people who have been wrongfully convicted and later found completely innocent—to begin their lives again and reclaim their rights as citizens.

Caldwell's fictional work began in the 'chick lit' genre, and she soon turned to writing mysteries and thrillers, most recently focusing her attention on a returning character, Izzy McNeil. The series has received critical acclaim and nominations for prestigious industry awards. Caldwell is also a freelance magazine writer and has been widely published both domestically and internationally.

Education 
Caldwell graduated Phi Beta Kappa from the University of Iowa and earned her J.D. with honors from Loyola University Chicago School of Law.

Speaker 
Caldwell spoke internationally, empowering audiences to overcome adversity by sharing the stories of her Life After Innocence clients and how they went from wrongfully imprisoned to regaining their lives.

Author 

Caldwell, who lived in the Chicago area, continued to write and bring about change in the legal system. Caldwell was a published author of 16 books – 14 novels and two nonfiction:

Anatomy of Innocence: Testimonies of the Wrongfully Convicted (2018, Liveright), The Dog Park (2014, Mira)
False Impressions (2012, Mira)
Question of Trust (2012, Mira)
Claim of Innocence (2011, Mira)
Long Way Home: A Young Man Lost In the System and the Two Women Who Found Him (2010, Free Press)
Red White & Dead (2009, Mira)
Red Blooded Murder (2009, Mira)
Red Hot Lies (2009, Mira)
The Good Liar (2008, Mira)
The Rome Affair (2006, Mira)
The Night I Got Lucky (2005, Red Dress Ink)
Look Closely (2005, Mira)
The Year of Living Famously (2004, Mira)
A Clean Slate (2003, Red Dress Ink)
Burning The Map (2002, Mira)

Death
Caldwell died on March 1, 2020, in River Forest, Illinois, of breast cancer.

See also
List of wrongful convictions in the United States

References

External links
 Official website
 http://www.anatomyofinnocence.com/

Articles featuring Caldwell
 Most Influential Women Lawyers (Crain's Chicago Business)
 Mystery and Thriller Writers Tell the Stories of the Wrongfully Convicted in New Book (ABA Journal) 
 Me, My Shelf and I (Chicago Tribune)
 Lawyers with Style: Laura Caldwell (Chicago Lawyer Magazine)
 For Laura Caldwell, fact and fiction are intertwined (Crain's Chicago Business)

1967 births
2020 deaths
21st-century American novelists
Loyola University Chicago alumni
Loyola University Chicago School of Law faculty
Illinois lawyers
University of Iowa alumni
American women novelists
21st-century American women writers
Novelists from Illinois
American women legal scholars
American legal scholars
American women academics